Zoe Ann Lyons (born 3 October 1971) is a British comedian.

Early and personal life
Lyons was born to an Irish father and an English mother in Haverfordwest, Pembrokeshire, Wales. Her family soon moved to Ireland, where she attended a Catholic primary school in Dunmore East in County Waterford. The family then moved to Clonmel, County Tipperary, to Epsom, Surrey, when Lyons was nine, and then to Glasgow.

Her first job was in a jam factory in Glasgow. Lyons lives in Brighton with her wife Sindy, a nurse, originally from the Netherlands, who is 14 years her senior. The two met 20 years ago whilst on holiday on the isle of Lesvos, through mutual friends.

Lyons shared an Instagram post in 2020 about her alopecia in hopes it would help "someone even just a little bit".

Career
Lyons graduated from the University of York in 1992 with a degree in psychology. Soon making the decision to become a performer, she moved to London, and trained at The Poor School, thereafter working as a waitress while seeking acting roles and attending stand-up comedy performances.

She appeared on the ITV reality game show Survivor in 2001, in its first series, placing 6th out of 16 contestants. She left after two members of her Ular tribe alliance (Richard and Jackie) aligned with the eventual winner, Charlotte, to vote against her. She was voted out in a countback tie-breaker - where votes cast during previous episodes come into play. Lyons along with the rest of the Jury of Eliminated players voted for Charlotte to win.

In 2004, Lyons won the Funny Women Awards beating Anna Crilly and Janie Phayre. Since then, she has toured the UK stand-up circuit, as well as playing regular gigs in London and Brighton. In 2007, her debut solo show, "Fight or Flight", was nominated for the best newcomer award at the Edinburgh Fringe Festival. In 2008, her second solo show, "Mangled Mantra of the Messed up Modern Mind", featured a joke which was awarded digital television channel Dave's Joke of the Fringe.

Lyons featured in The Independents tenth annual Pink List for 2009, detailing the 101 most influential lesbian and gay people in Britain. Lyons was placed at number 81.

In 2011, as part of her second international tour, Lyons was invited to perform "Clownbusting" at the Melbourne Comedy Festival in Australia. Reviews were favourable, with a critic from Australian Stage reporting: "I have renewed faith in stand-up comedy after seeing UK comedian Zoe Lyons. 'Clownbusting' is a magnificently written and delivered show which holds from start to finish".

Television and radio

Lyons' television credits include appearances on Mock the Week, Michael McIntyre's Comedy Roadshow, The Paul O'Grady Show, The Wright Stuff (as a regular guest panellist), Room 101, Dave's One Night Stand and QI.

Her radio appearances have included Clive Anderson's Chat Room (BBC Radio 2), PMQ with Andy Parsons (BBC Radio 4), 4 Stands Up (BBC Radio 4), The Jon Richardson Show (BBC 6 Music), The Christian O'Connell Solution (BBC Radio 5 Live), Jo Caulfield Won't Shut Up (BBC Radio 4) and The Unbelievable Truth (BBC Radio 4).

From 2018, Lyons has appeared in Tui adverts on Sky One, alongside fellow comedian Mark Watson.

In 2021, Lyons hosted her own teatime TV quiz show, Lightning, on BBC Two, as well as Stand Up and Deliver on Channel 4, where she mentored Katie McGlynn.

Awards
 Winner, London Awards for Art and Performance: Comedy, 2011
 Nominated, Dave's Joke of the Fringe, 2009
 Winner, Dave's Joke of the Fringe, 2008
 Nominated, Best Newcomer, if.comedy Awards, 2007
 Winner, Funny Women Awards, 2004
 Finalist, 'So You Think You're Funny', 2004

References

External links

 
 Official website
 Chortle biography

1971 births
Living people
21st-century British comedians
Alumni of the University of York
British women comedians
Welsh lesbian actresses
Welsh LGBT broadcasters
Lesbian comedians
Welsh LGBT comedians
People from Haverfordwest